Gretteåsen is a village in Re municipality, Norway. Its population is 200.

References

Villages in Vestfold og Telemark